Dass may refer to:

People

Given name 
 Dass Gregory Kolopis (born 1977), former Malaysian football player

Surname 
 Anuj Dass (born 1974), Indian cricketer
 Baba Dharam Dass, ancestor worshiped by Jains in Pasrur, Pakistan
 Baba Hari Dass (1923−2018), Indian monk
Constance Prem Nath Dass (1886−1971), Indian college administrator
 Dean Dass, English cricketer
 Petter Dass (1647−1707), Norwegian poet
 Ram Dass (1931–2019), American contemporary spiritual teacher and former Harvard professor of psychology
 ShakthiDass (born 1948), Indian painter
 Shelly Dass, news anchor in the Republic of Trinidad and Tobago
 Secundra Dass, character in Robert Louis Stevenson's The Master of Ballantrae

Places
 Dass, Nigeria, Local Government Area of Bauchi State in Nigeria
 Dass language, Afro-Asiatic language spoken in Nigeria
 Kari Dass, a village, India

Acronym
DASS may also stand for:
 Digital Access Signalling System, defunct means of providing Integrated Services Digital Network throughout the United Kingdom
 Digital Access Signalling System 1 (DASS1)
 Digital Access Signalling System 2 (DASS2)
 DASS (psychology), an acronym for the Depression, Anxiety and Stress Scale
 Dialysis-associated Steal Syndrome (DASS), an infrequent complication of dialysis accesses
 Defensive Aid Sub-System, of aircraft
 Dacca American Society School
 Distress Alerting Satellite System, a search and rescue satellite system

See also
 Das (disambiguation)